Phenacogrammus bleheri is a species of fish in the African tetra family. It is known only from a small tributary of the Bari River in the Lua River system in the Ubangi River drainage, in the middle Congo River basin in the Democratic Republic of the Congo.

Etymology
The tetra is named in honor of explorer and ornamental fish wholesaler Heiko Bleher, who provided a lot of specimens for Géry's study, including the type specimen of this species.

References

Alestidae
Freshwater fish of Africa
Taxa named by Jacques Géry
Fish described in 1995